The Carol I National College is a high school located in central Craiova, Romania, on Ioan Maiorescu Street. It is one of the most prestigious secondary education institutions in Romania.
Between 1947 and 1997 it operated under the name of Nicolae Bălcescu High School.

History
The Central High School was officially established on 20 May 1826, although it was actually built 7 years later in 1833. After suffering heavy damage from the earthquake of 11 January 1838, the school was rebuilt in November 1842 and it had some 400 students. 

Craiova's Central High School was  renamed "Carol I Liceum" on 11 November 1885 by a Royal decree of King Carol I.

It was re-built a second time after the 1977 earthquake that demolished a major part of its buildings.

Alumni
The following is a short list of the most notable alumni of the Carol I National College. 
 Theodor Aman, painter and graphic artist
 Constantin Angelescu, Prime Minister
 , chemist
 Corneliu Baba, painter
 , philologist, literary critic
 Nicolae Bănescu, historian
 , agronomist
 Al. C. Calotescu-Neicu, columnist
 Gheorghe Chițu, lawyer and politician
 Radu Ciuceanu, historian and politician
 George Constantinescu, engineer
 Traian Demetrescu, poet, novelist, and literary critic
 , jurist
 Dimitrie Gerota, anatomist, physician, radiologist, and urologist
 Tudor Gheorghe, musician, poet, and actor
 , physicist
 Radu Gyr, poet, essayist, playwright, and journalist
 Eugène Ionesco, playwright and dramatist
 Traian Lalescu, mathematician
 Alexandru Macedonski, poet, novelist, dramatist, and literary critic
 Ion Gheorghe Maurer, Prime Minister
 Titu Maiorescu, philologist, literary critic, politician
 Duiliu Marcu, architect
 , jurist
 Gib Mihăescu, writer
 Alexandru Mironov, science-fiction writer, journalist, and politician
 Jean Negulescu, film director, screenwriter, and a pioneer in cinemascope
 Constantin S. Nicolăescu-Plopșor, historian, archeologist, and folklorist
 , writer
 Mihai Pătrașcu, computer scientist
 Adrian Păunescu, poet
 Amza Pellea, actor
 , archaelogist and historian
 Petrache Poenaru, inventor
 Nicolae Popescu, mathematician
 Ioan Nicolae Romanescu, pilot and aviation pioneer
 Mihail Șerban, biochemist
 , paleontologist
 Eraclie Sterian, physician, writer, and political activist
 Simion Stoilow, mathematician
 Eugen Taru, graphic artist
 Gheorghe Tătărescu, politician who served twice as Prime Minister of Romania and three times as Minister of Foreign Affairs
 Gheorghe Țițeica, mathematician
 Nicolae Titulescu, diplomat, politician
 Ion Țuculescu, painter
 George Vâlsan, geographer
 Nicolae Vasilescu-Karpen, engineer and physicist
 Pan M. Vizirescu, poet and essayist
 Ștefan Voitec, communist politician who served as President of the Great National Assembly

References

External links

Carol I High School Web Site

Schools in Dolj County
Educational institutions established in 1826
1826 establishments in Wallachia
Neoclassical architecture in Romania
Buildings and structures in Craiova
National Colleges in Romania